Unified Team competed at the 1992 Winter Paralympics in Tignes/Albertville, France. 21 competitors from Unified Team won 21 medals including 10 gold, 8 silver and 3 bronze and finished 2nd in the medal table.

See also
 Unified Team at the Paralympics
 Unified Team at the 1992 Winter Olympics

References

Unified Team at the Paralympics
Nations at the 1992 Winter Paralympics